The Singles is the first greatest hits album by English electronic music duo Basement Jaxx, released on 21 March 2005 via XL. The album contains two new songs, "Oh My Gosh" and "U Don't Know Me", which were both released as singles. "Do Your Thing" was previously included on the 2001 Rooty album, but with the release of this compilation album, the single was re-released in the UK after the two aforementioned singles.

Later editions of The Singles included the "JaxxHouz" radio edit of "U Don't Know Me" in place of the original album version. A special edition of the release included a second disc of previously unreleased material.

Background and release
Talking about the compilation, Buxton told Canadian music magazine The Record:

"Oh My Gosh" was the first single from the album. Released simultaneously with the album was The Videos, a video album containing the group's music videos, several live tracks, and four extra video clips.

Critical reception

Andy Kellman from AllMusic gave the album a very positive review, calling it "a timely and nearly faultless stop-gap compilation."

PopMatters ranked the album the 19th-best reissue of 2005.

Promotion

Tour

Glastonbury Festival headlining
On 6 June 2005, it was announced last-minute that the duo would replace Kylie Minogue as headliners for the 2005 Glastonbury Festival, due to Minogue being diagnosed with breast cancer. According to The Guardian, the reactions to this news were "muted". Basement Jaxx' headlining was said to be a departure from the usual rock bands that used to headline the festival, as was Minogue's planned appearance.

While performing onstage, Scottish musician Bobby Gillespie called the band "Cocksuckers – no offence to cocksuckers," before slating everyone from Minogue to the crowd itself and eventually getting booed off stage. Basement Jaxx's vocalist Vula Malinga recalls: "I remember us girls were like 'WHAT? Shut Up! Come on let's take him! Warrrgh', but the guys were just like 'Everyone's entitled to their opinion.' In the end I think the crowd spoke for itself."

Despite heavy rainfall during the year's festival, the duo's performance was well received. They also included a carnival version of Motörhead's "Ace of Spades" in their set.

Track listing

Charts

Weekly charts

Year-end charts

Certifications

The Videos

The Videos is a DVD by Basement Jaxx containing all official music videos, several live tracks, and four extra video clips.

It was released at the same time as The Singles.

Track listing
The Videos
 "Red Alert"
 "Rendez-Vu"
 "Jump N' Shout"
 "Bingo Bango"
 "Romeo"
 "Jus 1 Kiss"
 "Where's Your Head At"
 "Lucky Star"
 "Good Luck"
 "Plug It In"
 "Cish Cash"
 "Oh My Gosh"
 "Flylife"

Live Traxx
 "Red Alert" (Glastonbury 2000)
 "Jump N' Shout" (Glastonbury 2000)
 "Do Your Thing" (V2002)
 "Cish Cash" (Werchter 2004)
 "Lucky Star" (Fuji Rock 2004)
 "Good Luck" (Glastonbury 2004)
 "Supersonic" (Glastonbury 2004)
 "Where's Your Head At" (Glastonbury 2004)

Extras
 "The Road to Coachella"
 "Jaxx TV"
 "Tokyo Stench"
 "Bongaloid"

See also
List of UK Albums Chart number ones of the 2000s

References

Basement Jaxx albums
2005 greatest hits albums
XL Recordings compilation albums
2005 video albums
Basement Jaxx video albums
Live video albums
Music video compilation albums
2005 live albums
2005 compilation albums